Craig Leipold is the owner of the Minnesota Wild of the National Hockey League (NHL). He previously owned the Nashville Predators.

Business career
Leipold is the founder of Ameritel, a business-to-business telemarketing firm in Neenah, Wis. He also was the past owner of the Rainfair Company, which made protective footwear. He has also been a director of Gaylord Entertainment Company, owner of the Grand Ole Opry in Nashville, Tennessee.

Hockey team ownership
Leipold first was considered a potential owner or investor in the NBA Milwaukee Bucks and Sacramento Kings teams. He attributed this interest to the fact that he knew the sport of basketball well. He became interested in ownership of a professional ice hockey franchise because there were more opportunities than in basketball.

Leipold bought an expansion franchise from the NHL in 1997 for $80 million. He sold the Nashville Predators due to rising operating costs and low fan attendance.  Leipold claims more than $70 million in losses during his tenure as owner of the Predators.  Initially, Leipold had an agreement to sell the team to Jim Balsillie for $220 million, but he withdrew from the agreement after Balsillie started season ticket advertising for a move of the team to Hamilton, Ontario. The Predators were sold instead to an investor group that included William J. "Boots" Del Biaggio. The final sale price of the Predators was reported as $193 million. Leipold has gone on record objecting to Jim Balsillie becoming an NHL owner, stating that he doesn't trust Balsillie.

Leipold's purchase of the Minnesota Wild from founding owner Bob Naegele, Jr. was announced on January 10, 2008.  Leipold had this to say about his newest acquisition, "It is a true privilege to become part of the organization and the hockey community in Minnesota."  Fans of the Minnesota Wild had already begun welcoming Leipold as the new owner via the team's message board. Leipold's company Minnesota Sports & Entertainment also owns the Wild's AHL affiliate, the Iowa Wild (formerly the Houston Aeros). The company manages the Xcel Energy Center and the Saint Paul RiverCentre.

Personal
Leipold is active in numerous civic and corporate organizations as well as several charities benefiting children.  He has been named Nashville Sports Council "Sports Person of the Year," "1999 Father of the Year" by the Nashville Father's Day Council, and "Nashvillian of the Year" by the Easter Seals, following a highly successful 1998–1999 season for the Predators. He and his wife, Helen Johnson-Leipold, maintain residences in Racine, Wisconsin, and Saint Paul, Minnesota, and are the parents of five sons, Christopher, Kyle, Connor, Curtis, and Bradford, and a daughter in-law. Helen is the daughter of Samuel Curtis Johnson, Jr. of the S. C. Johnson family and is Chairman and Chief Executive officer of Johnson Outdoors, Inc. and Chairman of Johnson Financial Group Leipold is a prominent Republican and supporter of George W. Bush and Mitt Romney. The Xcel Energy Center hosted the 2008 Republican National Convention.

References

Nashville Predators owners
Minnesota Wild executives
Living people
National Hockey League executives
National Hockey League owners
1952 births